The slender grouper (Anyperodon leucogrammicus) is a species of marine ray-finned fish, a grouper from the subfamily Epinephelinae which is part of the family Serranidae, which also includes the anthias and sea basses. It is the only species in the genus Anyperodon. It is found in the Indo-Pacific region.

Systematics
Recent molecular analyses based on five genes show that Anyperodon leucogrammicus is included in the same clade as species of Epinephelus. Consequently, the species should be included in Epinephelus as Epinephelus leucogrammicus.

Description
The head occupies 40% of the total length and the mouth is large, with the lower jaw longer than the upper jaw. There are no palatine teeth, a fact which distinguishes this species from other groupers. The basic colour is pale reddish-brown liberally dotted with orange spots which are closer together on the head. There are five pale silvery blue longitudinal lines running down either side, the lower 3 reaching the tail but the upper two breaking into irregular streaks. The dorsal fin has 11 spines and 14 to 16 soft rays. The anal fin has 3 spines and 8 to 9 soft rays. Juvenile fish have vivid blue and red longitudinal stripes.

Distribution and habitat
The slender grouper has a wide distribution in the tropical Indian and Pacific Oceans.

Ecology
The slender grouper is carnivorous, feeding mainly on other fish such as goatfish but possibly also on invertebrates. Juvenile slender groupers are aggressive mimics of the red-lined wrasse, Halichoeres biocellatus and the silty wrasse, Halichoeres purpurescens. They resemble them in appearance and in behaviour which lulls a potential prey fish into a false sense of security and enables the grouper to approach it without detection.

Status
The slender grouper is considered of "least concern" by the IUCN Red List of Threatened Species. This is because it has a very wide range and populations do not seem to be in decline. It is not fished commercially but is occasionally seen in the fish markets in Hong Kong.

Utilization 
 Fishery : Small Trade
 Game: Angling

References

External links

External links
 

Epinephelini

Fish of Thailand
Fish described in 1828